Jamgany Narantsogt (born 19 August 1974) is a Mongolian boxer. He competed in the men's featherweight event at the 1996 Summer Olympics.

References

External links
 

1974 births
Living people
Mongolian male boxers
Olympic boxers of Mongolia
Boxers at the 1996 Summer Olympics
Place of birth missing (living people)
Boxers at the 1998 Asian Games
Asian Games competitors for Mongolia
Featherweight boxers
20th-century Mongolian people
21st-century Mongolian people